Se-yoon is a Korean unisex given name. Its meaning depends on the hanja used to write each syllable of the name. There are 15 hanja with the reading "se" and 16 hanja with the reading "yoon" on the South Korean government's official list of hanja which may be used in given names.

People with this name include:
Seyoon Kim (born 1946), South Korean-born American biblical scholar
Yoo Se-yoon (born 1980), South Korean comedian
Moon Se-yoon (born 1982), South Korean comedian
Crucial Star (born Park Se-yoon, 1989), South Korean rapper
Kim Se-yun (born 1999), South Korean football forward
Paek Se-yun, North Korean businessman and politician

See also
List of Korean given names

References

Korean unisex given names